Shibalapur is a village in Sangamner taluka of the Ahmednagar district in Maharashtra, India. The village is known for its temples, particularly Bhairavnath  Temple and Shahashibali Baba Temple. The village is 35 km from Shirdi, a town known as the home of Shri Sai Baba.

Population 
As per 2011 census, population of village is 3081, of which 1588 are males and 1493 are females.

Economy 
Main occupation of village resident is agriculture and allied works. The primary crops of the village are sugar cane, wheat and cotton.

Transport

Road 
Shibalapur  is connected to nearby villages Ashwi kd, Pimpri Louki, Shedgao and Panodi by village roads.

Bus 
Sangamner is the nearest Bus Stand to a village.

Rail 
Shrirampur (Belapur) is the nearest railway station to a village.

Air 
Shirdi Airport is the nearest airport to a village.

See also 

 List of villages in Sangamner taluka

References 

Ahmednagar district